Captain Mike Yates is a fictional character in the British science fiction television series Doctor Who, played by Richard Franklin. He was adjutant of the British contingent of UNIT, an international organization that defends Earth from alien threats.

Character history
Yates first appears in the Third Doctor serial Terror of the Autons, the latest in a line of Captains assisting Brigadier Lethbridge-Stewart, although the Doctor implies that he was around for previous stories. He proves more durable than his predecessors, appearing semi-regularly on the programme from 1971 to 1974 alongside the Brigadier and Sergeant Benton. Together with the Doctor and his companions, Yates fights off alien invasions, the machinations of the renegade Time Lord known as the Master, rogue computers and mutated maggots.

Little is known of him outside of his time with UNIT. He is cool under fire, efficient, and both gives and carries out his orders with a minimum of fuss. He appears to have a relatively good rapport with his men, although he does remind Benton on occasion that "rank hath its privileges." The Third Doctor's assistant, Jo Grant, is dressed up to go on a night on the town with Mike at the start of The Curse of Peladon, only to be taken on a trip in the TARDIS by the Doctor.

Yates's fall from grace starts when he is brainwashed by the artificial intelligence BOSS in the 1973 serial The Green Death. The brush with ecological disaster apparently made Yates very concerned about the future of the planet, and he is easily recruited by Sir Charles Grover into a conspiracy to reverse time and return Earth to a "golden age" (Invasion of the Dinosaurs). The conspiracy is thwarted by the Doctor, and in return for his past service to UNIT, the Brigadier allows Yates to take medical leave and then quietly resign (actor Richard Franklin believes the initial plan for this story was to kill off Yates).

Trying to recover, Yates attends a meditation centre where he uncovers strange goings-on, which he reports to Sarah Jane Smith. Sarah communicates this back to the Doctor, leading into the rest of the events of the Third Doctor's last serial, Planet of the Spiders.

Richard Franklin returned as an illusory image of Yates in the 20th Anniversary special The Five Doctors and reprised the role of Yates in the 1993 charity special Dimensions in Time. A photo of Yates meeting Special Space Security agent Sara Kingdom is seen amongst a collection of companion photographs kept by UNIT's Black Archive in the 50th anniversary story, The Day of the Doctor.

As one of the more prominent recurring supporting characters in the television series, Yates is often listed as a companion of the Doctor and indeed is listed as such on the official BBC Doctor Who website. However, he is not always listed as such - John Nathan-Turner's book Doctor Who: The Companions, for instance, excludes Yates.

Other appearances
Mike Yates has appeared in the spin-off novels taking place during his time with UNIT. In the Virgin Missing Adventures novels The Eye of the Giant by Christopher Bulis and The Scales of Injustice by Gary Russell, Yates begins as a sergeant in UNIT together with Benton and is promoted to Captain at the end of Scales, which takes place between the television stories Inferno and Terror of the Autons. The novel implies that he is promoted directly from Sergeant to Captain, which would be unusual if not impossible in most real-world militaries.

In the Past Doctor Adventures novel The Devil Goblins from Neptune by Keith Topping and Martin Day it is established that his full name is Michael Alexander Raymond Yates.

In the Past Doctor Adventures novel Verdigris by Paul Magrs, Yates is rendered amnesiac and subsequently turned two-dimensional. The Third Doctor later arranges for Yates to be restored to normal.

In Past Doctor Adventures novel Deep Blue, it is revealed that Mike had three brothers, and his mum thinks that Mike is the most sensitive.

Stories written as in-universe articles in Doctor Who Magazine Winter Special 1991, (subtitled "UNIT Exposed") describe significant post-UNIT activity for Yates. He founds an organisation called the Cosmic Earth Society; writes a book called Help From the Stars, which details the revelations of past extraterrestrial involvement in human evolution discovered by UNIT at Devil's End, and reveals other UNIT-operations information to a reporter from the Metropolitan. He claims that the actual cause of central London's evacuation was dinosaurs being brought forward in time (part of a plan that he admits to have been involved in and which was, he claimed, the real reason for his discharge from UNIT). This dovetails with Day of the Dinosaurs, an entry in a series of science fiction novels written by former UNIT associate Sarah Jane Smith, which feature an organization called WIN (World Investigative Network) commanded by General Lutwidge-Douglas. This leads another Metropolitan reporter to doubt that Yates is a crackpot as generally believed.

Richard Franklin also wrote an unpublished novel featuring Mike Yates, The Killing Stone, set after the events of Spiders. It was released as an audio book, read by Franklin, by BBV in 2002.

In 2009, Franklin reprised the role of Mike Yates for a series of five audio dramas produced by BBC Audio under the umbrella title Hornets' Nest. The series sees Yates partner with the Fourth Doctor, played by Tom Baker.  He reunites with the Fourth Doctor in the subsequent sequel series, Demon Quest and Serpent Crest.

List of appearances

Television

Season 8
 Terror of the Autons
 The Mind of Evil
 The Claws of Axos
 The Dæmons
Season 9
 Day of the Daleks (Episodes 1 – 2 & 4)
 The Time Monster (Episodes 1 – 4)
Season 10
 The Green Death (Episodes 4 – 6)
Season 11
 Invasion of the Dinosaurs
 Planet of the Spiders
20th anniversary special
 The Five Doctors (cameo)
30th anniversary special
 Dimensions in Time

Audio drama
 The Blue Tooth (adventure related by the character Liz Shaw) by Nigel Fairs
 The Magician's Oath by Scott Handcock
 Hornets' Nest
 Demon Quest
 Serpent Crest
 The Rings of Ikiria
 Destiny of the Doctor: Vengeance of the Stones

Novels
Virgin Missing Adventures
 Dancing the Code by Paul Leonard
 The Eye of the Giant by Christopher Bulis
 The Scales of Injustice by Gary Russell
 Speed of Flight by Paul Leonard

Virgin New Adventures
 Happy Endings by Paul Cornell

Virgin sidestep novel
 Who Killed Kennedy by David Bishop (letter to a UNIT casualty's next-of-kin is signed by Yates)

Past Doctor Adventures
 The Devil Goblins from Neptune by Martin Day and Keith Topping
 The Face of the Enemy by David A. McIntee
 Deep Blue by Mark Morris
 Verdigris by Paul Magrs
 Rags by Mick Lewis
 Deadly Reunion by Terrance Dicks and Barry Letts

Unlicensed novel, released on CD
 The Killing Stone by Richard Franklin

Short stories
 "Brief Encounter--Listening Watch" by Dan Abnett (Doctor Who Magazine Winter Special 1991)
 "Prisoners of the Sun" by Tim Robins (Decalog; parallel universe version of Yates)
 "Where the Heart Is" by Andy Lane (Decalog 2: Lost Property)
 "Housewarming" by David A. McIntee (Decalog 2: Lost Property)
 "The Switching" by Simon Guerrier (Short Trips: Zodiac)
 "UNIT Christmas Parties: Christmas Truce" by Terrance Dicks (Short Trips: A Christmas Treasury)
 "Operation H.A.T.E" by Richard Franklin

See also
 UNIT
 List of Doctor Who supporting characters

References

External links

 Captain Mike Yates on the BBC's Doctor Who website

Television characters introduced in 1971
Recurring characters in Doctor Who
UNIT personnel
Fictional military captains
Fictional British Army officers
British male characters in television